Kampala Hospital is a private healthcare facility in Uganda. It is a specialists' hospital and diagnostic centre. Kampala Hospital was the first hospital in Uganda to install a Magnetic Resonance Imaging (MRI) machine and a CT Scanner. For almost five years it was the only hospital in the country, providing these services.

Location
The coordinates of Kampala Hospital are: 00°19'59.0"N, 32°35'04.0"E (Latitude:0.333056, Longitude:32.584444).

History
Beginning in 2000, a number of physicians, surgeons, businessmen and community leaders came up with the idea of starting a private hospital in Kampala to address the need for quality healthcare and to offer medical services that were only available in foreign countries like Kenya, South Africa, India, United Kingdom and United States. The founders and investor-owners of the hospital include Richard Kanyerezi, Jack Luyombya, Edward Kigonya, Nelson Senkaatuuka, John Nsibambi, James Batwala, Leo Kibirango and Ntwatwa Kyagulanyi. They pooled resources, including taking out personal loans and mortgages to fund the opening of the hospital in 2007. The hospital provides full laboratory services. It still is undergoing expansion to provide more specialty services and increase its bed capacity. Kampala Hospital is one of five upscale, tertiary hospitals in the city of Kampala that provide quality healthcare at a price; the others being Case Medical Centre on Buganda Road, International Hospital Kampala in Namuwongo, Nakasero Hospital on Akii Bua Road and Paragon Hospital in Bugoloobi.

Services offered
The services offered at KHL include the following: 1. Emergency Ambulance 2. Emergency services 3. Outpatient Care 4. Laboratory 5. Trauma surgery 6. Pediatrics 7. Physiotherapy 8. Antenatal care 9. Pharmacy.

Specialties
, the following speciality services are available at KHL. The list is not exhaustive:
1. General Surgery 2. Physician Anaesthesia 3. Obstetrics & Gynaecology 4. Paediatrics 5. Neonatology 6. Orthopaedics 7. Neurosurgery 8. Medical Oncology 9. Surgical Oncology 10. Urology 11. we also offer an Open Intensive care unit and specialised Pain Management with specialist Doctors Like Emyedu Andrew, Atumanya Patience and Highly specialized Critical care Nurses Like Dan Muramuzi, and Kyaga Yusuf
11. Cardiology 12. Otolaryngology 13. Plastic Surgery 14. Reconstructive Surgery 15. Internal Medicine 16. Family Medicine 17. Radiology 18. Psychiatry 19. Endoscopy 20. Colposcopy.

See also

References

External links
 Website of Kampala Hospital
 List of Hospitals In Kampala Recommended by the United States Embassy In Uganda

Hospital buildings completed in 2007
2007 establishments in Uganda
Hospitals in Kampala
Kampala Central Division
Kampala Capital City Authority